Alan Paul Maybury (born 8 August 1978) is an Irish professional football coach and former player, who currently manages Scottish League One club Edinburgh. 

Maybury was a defender, who could play in either full-back position. He played for Leeds United, Reading, Crewe Alexandra, Heart of Midlothian, Leicester City, Aberdeen, Colchester United, St Johnstone, Hibernian and Falkirk. Maybury also represented the Republic of Ireland, earning 10 full international caps between 1998 and 2005.

Playing career

Leeds
Maybury was born in Dublin. As a youngster he was linked to Rangers and was anecdotally the first player from the Republic of Ireland to be offered a youth contract. However, he decided to start his senior career at Leeds United. Maybury played for the Republic of Ireland national under-19 football team at the 1996 UEFA European Under-18 Football Championship finals in Luxembourg. At Leeds he occasionally deputised for compatriot Gary Kelly in the right-back berth but predominantly spent his time in the reserves. In spite of his lack of competitive football during this period, he attained two caps for Republic of Ireland in friendly internationals.

In an attempt to gain experience of regular first-team action, Maybury spent spells on loan at Reading and Crewe between 1999 and 2001. Returning to Elland Road, he also played in Leeds' 3-3 draw with Lazio in the UEFA Champions League, during which he suffered a serious knee injury due to a horror tackle by Pavel Nedvěd.

Hearts
Despite agreeing a new one-year deal, Maybury continued to find it hard to displace Gary Kelly and decided it was in his best interests to leave, with Craig Levein paying £130,000 to secure his services for Hearts in October 2001. He made his Hearts debut in a convincing 3–0 victory over St Johnstone later that month, and quickly became a first team regular. The club recorded successive third-place finishes in the SPL in 2002–03 and 2003–04. Although by preference a right-back, he would often deputise at left-back when required, and occasionally in right midfield. Maybury eventually became the club's vice-captain and, by the summer of 2004, earned a recall to the Irish international squad.

Leicester
When Levein left Hearts to manage Leicester City, he made signing Maybury one of his priorities and Alan joined up at the Walkers Stadium in January 2005 for a nominal fee, in a double signing with striker Mark de Vries, both signing three and a half-year contracts. Levein was eventually sacked, but Maybury continued to feature in the first team, playing at right back.

On 14 August 2006, Leicester were approached by Sunderland regarding Maybury's availability. The deal possibly fell through with no news update. Maybury was however transfer listed by then-manager Martin Allen on 4 June 2007, having been replaced by Bruno Ngotty and Richard Stearman. He was given permission to train with Hearts on 21 January 2008, to maintain his fitness while searching for a new club.

On 15 May 2008, he was released by Leicester as his contract was close to expiring and was not going to be renewed by the club.

Aberdeen
Maybury signed for Aberdeen on loan until end of the season on 31 January 2008. He made his debut for Aberdeen on 2 February, in the 5th round of the Scottish Cup against Hamilton Academical. He came on as a substitute for Stuart Duff in the 69th minute as Aberdeen went on to win 1–0. He played for Aberdeen against Bayern Munich in the UEFA Cup and was deemed guilty of a handball against Ze Roberto in the penalty area, conceding a penalty that led to Bayern's second equaliser, with the score previously at 2–1. Aberdeen went on to draw the match 2–2.

Maybury was given a trial by Bristol City on 23 July 2008.

Colchester United
Maybury signed for Colchester United on 12 December 2008 on a free transfer after a three-week trial and made his debut the following day against his first club Leeds United. On 23 June 2009, Maybury signed a new contract

St Johnstone
Maybury signed for St Johnstone on a free transfer in August 2010. He made 47 appearances in two Scottish Premier League seasons with the Perth club.

Hibernian
After leaving St Johnstone, Maybury trained with Hibernian during the 2012–13 pre-season and played in a friendly match against East Fife. He signed a one-year contract with Hibernian in August 2012, making him one of a handful of players to have played in the first team for both Edinburgh rivals. Maybury signed on for another year at Easter Road in the summer of 2013 in a player/development coach role. The club was relegated at the end of the 2013–14 season, after which Maybury was released from his contract.

Falkirk
On 26 June 2014, it was confirmed that Maybury had signed for Scottish Championship club Falkirk in a player-coach capacity. He was placed in charge of Falkirk Under-20's side, which he said was his main focus – but confirmed he had also signed as a player so he was available to play if needed by manager Peter Houston. He made his competitive debut for Falkirk in a 7–1 win away to East Stirlingshire in the Scottish Challenge Cup, starting at right-back. He also played the full 90 minutes on 23 August as Falkirk won 1–0 against his former team, Hibernian.

Coaching career
Towards the end of his playing career, Maybury had taken coaching roles with Hibernian and Falkirk. He was appointed to a coaching position by St Johnstone in June 2018. He joined Kilmarnock as a coach in June 2021. In March 2022, Maybury was appointed manager of Edinburgh City on an interim basis.

Career Statistics

A. Includes Football League Trophy: (Colchester), Champions League: (Leeds), UEFA Cup: (Hearts & Aberdeen) & Europa League: (Hibernian)

Managerial Record

 Initially caretaker and appointed permanently on 19 May 2022

Honours

Manager
Edinburgh City
 Scottish League One play-offs: 2021–22

References

External links
 
 Profile at londonhearts.com

1978 births
Living people
Irish Protestants
Republic of Ireland international footballers
Republic of Ireland association footballers
Republic of Ireland under-21 international footballers
Republic of Ireland B international footballers
Republic of Ireland youth international footballers
Home Farm F.C. players
Heart of Midlothian F.C. players
Aberdeen F.C. players
Leeds United F.C. players
Leicester City F.C. players
Colchester United F.C. players
St Johnstone F.C. players
Association footballers from County Dublin
Premier League players
Scottish Premier League players
Reading F.C. players
Crewe Alexandra F.C. players
English Football League players
Association football fullbacks
Hibernian F.C. players
Scottish Professional Football League players
Falkirk F.C. non-playing staff
Hibernian F.C. non-playing staff
Falkirk F.C. players
St Johnstone F.C. non-playing staff
St. Kevin's Boys F.C. players
People educated at Mount Temple Comprehensive School
Oldham Athletic A.F.C. non-playing staff
F.C. Edinburgh managers
Republic of Ireland football managers
Scottish Professional Football League managers